Singapore competed at the 2018 Commonwealth Games in Gold Coast, Australia from April 4 to April 15, 2018.

Singapore's team consists of 59 athletes competing in 11 sports (including four para-sport competitors). The country also made its Commonwealth Games debut in beach volleyball (the sport also made its debut) and lawn bowls.

Sport shooter Teo Shun Xie was the country's flag bearer during the opening ceremony.

Medalists

Competitors
The following is the list of number of competitors participating at the Games per sport/discipline.

Athletics

Women
Field events

Badminton

Singapore participated with ten athletes (five men and five women)

Singles

Doubles

Mixed team

Roster

Danny Bawa Chrisnanta
Grace Chua
Terry Hee
Loh Kean Yew
Ryan Ng
Ren-ne Ong
Tan Wei Han
Jason Wong
Crystal Wong
Yeo Jia Min

Pool B

Quarterfinals

Semifinals

Bronze Medal Match

Beach volleyball

Singapore qualified a women's beach volleyball team for a total of two athletes.

Cycling

Singapore participated with 1 athlete (1 woman).

Track
Points race

Scratch race

Diving

Singapore participated with a team of 1 athlete (1 man).

Men

Gymnastics

Artistic
Singapore participated with 5 athletes (4 men and 1 woman).

Men
Team Final & Individual Qualification

Women
Individual Qualification

Rhythmic
Singapore participated with 1 athlete (1 woman).

Individual Qualification

Individual Finals

Lawn bowls

Singapore will compete in Lawn bowls. This marked the Commonwealth Games debut for the country in the sport.

Shooting

Singapore participated with 17 athletes (10 men and 7 women).

Men

Women

Swimming

Singapore participated with 5 athletes (3 men and 2 women).

Men

Women

Table tennis

Singapore participated with 10 athletes (5 men and 5 women).

Singles

Doubles

Team

Weightlifting

Singapore participated with 1 athlete (1 man).

Powerlifting

Singapore participated with 1 athlete (1 man).

See also
Singapore at the 2018 Winter Olympics
Singapore at the 2018 Summer Youth Olympics

References

Nations at the 2018 Commonwealth Games
Singapore at the Commonwealth Games
2018 in Singaporean sport